Players and pairs who neither have high enough rankings nor receive wild cards may participate in a qualifying tournament held one week before the annual Wimbledon Tennis Championships.

Seeds

  Patrick McEnroe /  Meredith McGrath (qualified)
  Bruce Derlin /  Julie Richardson (qualified)
  Bret Garnett /  Kristine Radford (qualified)
  Glenn Michibata /  Anke Huber (qualifying competition, lucky losers)
  Kent Kinnear /  Robyn Field (qualifying competition, lucky losers)
 n/a

Qualifiers

  Patrick McEnroe /  Meredith McGrath
  Bruce Derlin /  Julie Richardson
  Bret Garnett /  Kristine Radford

Lucky losers

  Glenn Michibata /  Anke Huber
  Kent Kinnear /  Robyn Field
  Piet Norval /  Mariaan de Swardt
  Lan Bale /  Jane Thomas

Qualifying draw

First qualifier

Second qualifier

Third qualifier

External links
1990 Wimbledon Championships – Doubles draws and results at the International Tennis Federation

Mixed Doubles Qualifying
Wimbledon Championship by year – Qualifying